Jackals are medium-sized canids native to Africa and Eurasia. While the word "jackal" has historically been used for many canines of the subtribe canina, in modern use it most commonly refers to three species: the closely related black-backed jackal (Lupulella mesomelas) and side-striped jackal (Lupulella adusta) of sub-Saharan-Africa, and the golden jackal (Canis aureus) of south-central Europe and Asia. The African golden wolf (Canis lupaster) was also formerly considered as a jackal.

While they do not form a monophyletic clade, all jackals are opportunistic omnivores, predators of small to medium-sized animals and proficient scavengers. Jackals are crepuscular, most active at dawn and dusk.

Their most common social unit is a monogamous pair, which defends its territory from other pairs by vigorously chasing intruding rivals and marking landmarks around the territory with their urine and feces. The territory may be large enough to hold some young adults, which stay with their parents until they establish their own territories. Jackals may occasionally assemble in small packs, for example, to scavenge a carcass, but they normally hunt either alone or in pairs.

Etymology 
The English word "jackal" dates back to 1600 and derives from the French chacal, from Turkish çakal, derived from the Persian  , which is in turn derived from the Sanskrit शृगाल śṛgāla meaning "the howler".

Taxonomy and relationships 

Similarities between jackals and coyotes led Lorenz Oken, in the third volume of his Lehrbuch der Naturgeschichte (1815), to place these species into a new separate genus, Thos, named after the classical Greek word  "jackal", but his theory had little immediate impact on taxonomy at the time. Angel Cabrera, in his 1932 monograph on the mammals of Morocco, questioned whether or not the presence of a cingulum on the upper molars of the jackals and its corresponding absence in the rest of Canis could justify a subdivision of that genus. In practice, Cabrera chose the undivided-genus alternative and referred to the jackals as Canis instead of Thos.

Oken's Thos theory was revived in 1914 by Edmund Heller, who embraced the separate genus theory. Heller's names and the designations he gave to various jackal species and subspecies live on in current taxonomy, although the genus has been changed from Thos to Canis.

The wolf-like canids are a group of large carnivores that are genetically closely related because they all have 78 chromosomes. The group includes genus Canis, Cuon, and Lycaon. The members are the dog (C. lupus familiaris), gray wolf (C. lupus),  coyote (C. latrans), golden jackal (C. aureus), Ethiopian wolf (C. simensis), black-backed jackal (C. mesomelas), side-striped jackal (C. adustus), dhole (Cuon alpinus), and African wild dog (Lycaon pictus). The latest recognized member is the African wolf (C. lupaster), which was once thought to be an African branch of the golden jackal. As they possess 78 chromosomes, all members of the genus Canis are karyologically indistinguishable from each other, and from the dhole and the African hunting dog. The two African jackals are shown to be the most basal members of this clade, indicating the clade's origin from Africa. Canis arnensis arrived in Mediterranean Europe 1.9 million years ago and is probably the ancestor of modern jackals.

The paraphyletic nature of Canis with respect to Lycaon and Cuon has led to suggestions that the two African jackals should be assigned to different genera, Schaeffia for the side-striped jackal and Lupulella for the black-backed jackal or Lupulella for both.

The intermediate size and shape of the Ethiopian wolf has at times led it to be regarded as a jackal, thus it has also been called the "red jackal" or the "Simien jackal".

Species

Folklore and literature
Like foxes and coyotes, jackals are often depicted as clever sorcerers in the myths and legends of their regions. They are mentioned roughly 14 times in the Bible. It is frequently used as a literary device to illustrate desolation, loneliness, and abandonment, with reference to its habit of living in the ruins of former cities and other areas abandoned by humans. It is called "wild dog" in several translations of the Bible. In the King James Bible, Isaiah 13:21 refers to 'doleful creatures', which some commentators suggest are either jackals or hyenas.

In the Indian Panchatantra stories, the jackal is mentioned as wily and wise. In Bengali tantrik tradition, they represent the goddess Kali. It is said she appears as jackals when meat is offered to her.

The Serer religion and creation myth posits jackals were among the first animals created by Roog, the supreme deity of the Serer people.

References

Further reading
 The New Encyclopedia of Mammals edited by David Macdonald, Oxford University Press, 2001; 
 Cry of the Kalahari, by Mark and Delia Owens, Mariner Books, 1992.
 The Velvet Claw: A Natural History of the Carnivores, by David MacDonald, BBC Books, 1992.
 Foxes, Wolves, and Wild Dogs of the World, by David Alderton, Facts on File, 2004.

External links 
 Jackal at the African Wildlife Foundation
 Jackals at A-Z Animals
 Jackals of the African Crater at PBS.org

Jackals
Mammals described in 1758
Taxa named by Carl Linnaeus
Mammal common names